Brad Holmes (born July 29, 1979) is an American football executive who is the general manager and executive vice president for the Detroit Lions of the National Football League (NFL). Holmes previously served with the St. Louis / Los Angeles Rams in various executive roles from 2003 to 2020.

Education and playing career
Holmes attended George D. Chamberlain High School in Tampa, Florida, where he was captain of the football team, and was also elected homecoming king.  Holmes graduated cum laude from North Carolina A&T in 2002 with a Bachelor of Science in Journalism and Mass Communications, and was a four-year letterman for the Aggies at defensive tackle under head coach Bill Hayes.  In 1999, he was voted team captain and helped A&T win the Mid-Eastern Athletic Conference and Black college football national championship.  While visiting home after the 1999 season, Holmes was involved in a car accident that left him in a coma for a week.  After making a full recovery, he was cleared to play his final season of college football in 2001.

Executive career

Early career
Following his playing career, Holmes obtained a job with Enterprise Rent A Car while attempting to begin a career in professional sports.  He soon obtained a public relations internship with the Atlanta Hawks of the National Basketball Association (NBA) in 2002, which he parlayed into a public relations internship with the St. Louis Rams of the NFL in 2003.

St. Louis / Los Angeles Rams
In 2003, Holmes was hired by the St. Louis Rams as a public relations intern. While in St. Louis, Holmes struck up a friendship with Wilbert Montgomery, a two-time All-Pro running back and the Rams running backs coach from 1997 to 2005.  At the conclusion of the public relations internship, Montgomery assisted Holmes in securing a position in the Rams player personnel department.  From 2003 to 2012, Holmes served in a number of front office positions with the Rams, including scout, area scout, national Combine scout, and scouting assistant. Since joining the Rams in 2003, Holmes worked under Rams front office executives Charley Armey, Jay Zygmunt, Billy Devaney, and Les Snead.

In 2013, Holmes was named the Rams Director of College Scouting.  In this role, Holmes was integral in the acquisition of Rams "Mob Squad" Pro Bowlers Aaron Donald, Jared Goff, Todd Gurley, Cooper Kupp, Pharoh Cooper, and Cory Littleton.

Detroit Lions
On January 14, 2021, Holmes was named the executive vice president and general manager of the Detroit Lions.  Holmes signed a five-year contract, succeeding prior general manager Bob Quinn. Holmes' first transaction as general manager was trading longtime franchise quarterback Matthew Stafford to the Los Angeles Rams in exchange for two first round picks, a third round pick, and quarterback Jared Goff.

Personal life
Holmes is the son of Melvin Holmes, who played offensive line for the Pittsburgh Steelers from 1971 to 1973.  He is also the nephew of former Detroit Lions defensive back Luther Bradley, a 1978 first-round draft pick.  Holmes cousin, Alex Barron, was a first-round pick of the Rams in 2005.

Holmes is married to his wife, Lisa, and together they have a son, B.J., and a daughter, Lola.

References

External links
 Detroit Lions bio

1979 births
Living people
Detroit Lions executives
St. Louis Rams scouts
Los Angeles Rams scouts
People from Tampa, Florida
North Carolina A&T State University alumni
North Carolina A&T Aggies football players
Detroit Lions currentteam parameter articles
National Football League general managers
All Wikipedia articles written in American English
Wikipedia pages semi-protected against vandalism
African-American sports executives and administrators
African-American players of American football
21st-century African-American sportspeople
20th-century African-American sportspeople